Limenitis glorifica, the Honshu white admiral, is a butterfly of the family Nymphalidae. L. glorifica is endemic to the island of Honshu, in Japan, where it is found in temperate open or shrubland habitats.

Eggs are laid almost exclusively on Lonicera japonica.

Biological pest control
The release of the Honshu white admiral into New Zealand was approved in August 2013. The butterfly is being introduced to control Lonicera japonica, which is a pest plant in New Zealand.

References

Butterflies described in 1909
Limenitis